Transtillaspis empheria is a species of moth of the family Tortricidae. It is found in Napo Province, Ecuador.

The wingspan is 20.5 mm. The ground colour of the forewings is cinnamon, slightly mixed with brown in the basal area and brownish at the costa basally. The hindwings are dirty cream, strigulated (finely streaked) with pale brownish grey.

Etymology
The species name refers to the similarity with Transtillaspis galbana and is derived from Greek empheros (meaning similar).

References

Moths described in 2005
Transtillaspis
Moths of South America
Taxa named by Józef Razowski